Acraga victoria is a moth in the family Dalceridae. It was described by S.E. Miller in 1994. It is found in southern Brazil. The habitat consists of warm temperate wet forests.

The length of the forewings is 11.5–12 mm. Adults are dull orange, with orange-brown forewings. Adults have been recorded on wing in January.

Etymology
The species is named for Vitor O. Becker, who collected the type specimen.

References

Moths described in 1994
Dalceridae
Moths of South America